A Deputy Mayor is a member of the London Mayoral cabinet, in the executive arm of the Greater London Authority. They serve as political advisors with responsibilities and powers corresponding to portfolios delegated by the Mayor. One of them must be designated as the Statutory Deputy Mayor, a member of the London Assembly who serves as the temporary Mayor during a vacancy or temporary incapacity of the Mayor.

History
Colour key (for political parties): 

Current or final office holders of a mayoralty are highlighted in bold

Livingstone mayoralties
The 2000 London mayoral election was won by Ken Livingstone, who ran as an independent after being expelled from the Labour Party. He announced that he would rotate the position of deputy mayor equally between the four parties represented in the London Assembly (London Labour, London Conservatives, London Liberal Democrats and the London Green Party). He offered the role to Nicky Gavron of the Labour Party for the first year. After some political manoeuvring, she accepted.

However, in 2001, Ken Livingstone decided not to offer the role to the Conservatives, claiming it would be disruptive, so Nicky Gavron retained the post. In 2002 the Liberal Democrats were asked to nominate a candidate but declined, saying that it would be better to scrutinise the mayor from an independent position. Again Nicky Gavron remained. In 2003, the Greens accepted an offer to nominate a deputy mayor and selected Jenny Jones, who became London's second deputy mayor.

Nicky Gavron was originally chosen as the Labour candidate for the 2004 London mayoral election but she stepped aside when Ken Livingstone was invited to rejoin the party. They then ran on a joint ticket as Labour's candidates for the posts of mayor and deputy mayor. She served as Ken Livingstone's deputy for the duration of his second term.

In his first term, Ken Livingstone came under fire for delegating his powers to his chief of staff, Simon Fletcher, rather than the deputy mayor on several occasions.

Johnson mayoralties
After Boris Johnson became Mayor of London in May 2008, he appointed Richard Barnes as his statutory Deputy Mayor, with the specific responsibility for community cohesion and regeneration. However, he also gave the title of Deputy Mayor to several other people, each with a specific role: Ian Clement (Government Relations); Kit Malthouse (Policing); and Ray Lewis (Young People).

Sir Simon Milton, a former councillor, served as Deputy Mayor of Policy and Planning and Chief of Staff to Johnson until his death in office in 2011. In May 2011, Sir Edward Lister was then appointed as his successor. Richard Barnes ceased to be Deputy Mayor on 4 May 2012, when he lost his seat in the Assembly. Victoria Borwick succeeded him in the post. Borwick resigned in May 2015, following her election as Member of Parliament for Kensington, being succeeded by Roger Evans.

Khan mayoralty
The 2016 London mayoral election was won by Sadiq Khan for London Labour. Following the election, he appointed Joanne McCartney Statutory Deputy Mayor, along with nine additional deputy mayors, making Khan the first mayor to use all ten available Deputy Mayor spots.

References

Local government in London